Barboza's leaf-toed gecko (Hemidactylus bayonii) is a species of lizard in the family Gekkonidae. The species is endemic to Angola.

Etymology
The specific name, bayonii, is in honor of Portuguese naturalist Francisco Antonio Pinheiro Bayão, who was a planter and administrator in Angola.

Habitat

Description

Reproduction
H. bayonii is oviparous.

References

Further reading
Bocage JVB (1893). "Diagnoses de quelques nouvelles espèces de reptiles et batraciens d'Angola". Jornal de Sciencias Mathematicas, Physicas e Naturaes, Academia Real de Sciencias de Lisboa, Segunda Série 3: 115–121. (Hemidactylus bayonii, new species, pp. 116–117). (in French).
Ceríaco LMP, Agarwal I, Marques MP, Bauer AM (2020). "A review of the genus Hemidactylus Goldfuss, 1820 (Squamata: Gekkonidae) from Angola, with the description of two new species". Zootaxa 4746 (1): 1–71. (Hemidactylus bayonii, p. 20).
Rösler H (2000). "Kommentierte Liste der rezent, subrezent und fossil bekannten Geckotaxa (Reptilia: Gekkonomorpha)". Gekkota 2: 28–153. (Hemidactylus bayonii, p. 85). (in German).

Endemic fauna of Angola
Hemidactylus
Reptiles described in 1893